Lieutenant General Sir Charles Henry Gairdner,  (20 March 1898 – 22 February 1983) was a senior British Army officer who later occupied two viceregal positions in Australia. Born in Batavia (now Jakarta) in the Dutch East Indies, he was brought up in Ireland, and educated at Repton School and the Royal Military Academy, Woolwich, in England. Having served on active duty during the First World War, in which he sustained a serious wound to his right leg, Gairdner spent time at the Staff College, Camberley in the interwar period, and served as commanding officer of the 10th Royal Hussars, 6th Armoured Division and 8th Armoured Division during the Second World War. He retired from the army in 1949 and was appointed Governor of Western Australia in 1951, a position in which he served until 1963, when he assumed the role of Governor of Tasmania until 1968. Gairdner died in Nedlands, at the age of 84, and was awarded a state funeral.

Early life
Gairdner was born in Batavia, Netherlands East Indies (now Jakarta, Indonesia) on 20 March 1898. Brought up in County Galway, Ireland, he was educated at Repton School in England, and the Royal Military Academy, Woolwich. He married the Hon. Evelyn Constance Handcock, daughter of Albert Handcock, 5th Baron Castlemaine, in 1925.

Military career
Upon graduation, Gairdner was commissioned a second lieutenant in the artillery in May 1916 and sent to the Western Front. In this campaign, he sustained a serious wound to the right leg which necessitated numerous operations throughout his life and eventual amputation in 1976. After the war he transferred to cavalry. He spent two years at the Staff College, Camberley from 1933 to 1934. As a lieutenant colonel, from 1937 to 1940 he was the commanding officer of the 10th Royal Hussars, before being chief of staff of the 7th Armoured Division then General Officer Commanding of the 6th and 8th Armoured Divisions. Gairdner was General Sir Harold Alexander's Chief of Staff during the planning stage of Operation Husky but was relieved and went on to become Prime Minister Winston Churchill's personal emissary to Douglas MacArthur in the Far East. He was awarded the Medal of Freedom by the United States on 16 January 1947. He was appointed a Commander of the Order of the British Empire in 1941, Companion of the Order of the Bath in 1946 and Knight Commander of the Order of St Michael and St George in 1948.

Governor of Western Australia and Tasmania
Gairdner's distinguished military career was rewarded in 1951 when he was appointed Governor of Western Australia. He was governor during a number of royal visits to Perth – the earliest being that of Queen Elizabeth II in 1954. His long residency in Western Australia was during a time when Perth and Western Australia were undergoing significant post-war change. He was very popular with the Western Australian public.

Gairdner's tenure was relatively free of political or constitutional crisis. When Labor's loss of the October 1955 Bunbury by-election resulted in the Albert Hawke government's losing its parliamentary majority, the possibility was raised that the governor might have to exercise his reserve powers. However the parliament remained in recess until Labor won the ensuing 1956 general election. The Perth Chest Hospital was renamed Sir Charles Gairdner Hospital in his honour in May 1963. Gairdner stepped down from his post on 26 June 1963. He lobbied for the position of Governor of Tasmania and on 23 September 1963 was appointed for five years.

In February 1969 the Gairdners returned to Perth and settled at Peppermint Grove. Survived by his wife, Gairdner died on 22 February 1983 at Nedlands and was cremated after a state funeral.

Gairdner was a freemason. During his terms as both Governor of Western Australia and Governor of Tasmania, he was also Grand Master of the respective Grand Lodges.

References

Bibliography

External links
Generals of World War II

|-

|-

1898 births
1983 deaths
British Army lieutenant generals
10th Royal Hussars officers
British Army generals of World War II
Burials at Karrakatta Cemetery
Companions of the Order of the Bath
Governors of Tasmania
Governors of Western Australia
Knights Commander of the Order of St Michael and St George
Knights Commander of the Royal Victorian Order
Knights Grand Cross of the Order of the British Empire
Recipients of the Medal of Freedom
People from Batavia, Dutch East Indies
Graduates of the Staff College, Camberley
British Army personnel of World War I